The Nevinnomyssk constituency (No.66) is a Russian legislative constituency in Stavropol Krai. The constituency covers western Stavropol Krai, including parts of Stavropol. The constituency was created in 2015 from most of former Stavropol constituency, which during redistricting was moved eastward to central Stavropol Krai.

Members elected

Election results

2016

|-
! colspan=2 style="background-color:#E9E9E9;text-align:left;vertical-align:top;" |Candidate
! style="background-color:#E9E9E9;text-align:left;vertical-align:top;" |Party
! style="background-color:#E9E9E9;text-align:right;" |Votes
! style="background-color:#E9E9E9;text-align:right;" |%
|-
|style="background-color: " |
|align=left|Aleksandr Ishchenko
|align=left|United Russia
|
|48.25%
|-
|style="background-color:"|
|align=left|Viktor Goncharov
|align=left|Communist Party
|
|13.32%
|-
|style="background-color:"|
|align=left|Ilya Drozdov
|align=left|Liberal Democratic Party
|
|12.85%
|-
|style="background-color:"|
|align=left|Sergey Gorlo
|align=left|A Just Russia
|
|7.38%
|-
|style="background:"| 
|align=left|Ivan Kolesnikov
|align=left|Communists of Russia
|
|3.76%
|-
|style="background-color:"|
|align=left|Viktor Ilyinov
|align=left|The Greens
|
|2.17%
|-
|style="background-color: "|
|align=left|Valery Ledovskoy
|align=left|Yabloko
|
|2.09%
|-
|style="background-color: "|
|align=left|Georgy Bolshov
|align=left|Patriots of Russia
|
|1.88%
|-
|style="background-color: "|
|align=left|Vladimir Smirnov
|align=left|Party of Growth
|
|1.70%
|-
|style="background-color:"|
|align=left|Vladimir Nazarenko
|align=left|Rodina
|
|1.59%
|-
| colspan="5" style="background-color:#E9E9E9;"|
|- style="font-weight:bold"
| colspan="3" style="text-align:left;" | Total
| 
| 100%
|-
| colspan="5" style="background-color:#E9E9E9;"|
|- style="font-weight:bold"
| colspan="4" |Source:
|
|}

2021

|-
! colspan=2 style="background-color:#E9E9E9;text-align:left;vertical-align:top;" |Candidate
! style="background-color:#E9E9E9;text-align:left;vertical-align:top;" |Party
! style="background-color:#E9E9E9;text-align:right;" |Votes
! style="background-color:#E9E9E9;text-align:right;" |%
|-
|style="background-color: " |
|align=left|Olga Timofeyeva
|align=left|United Russia
|
|64.09%
|-
|style="background-color:"|
|align=left|Grigory Ponomarenko
|align=left|Communist Party
|
|10.53%
|-
|style="background-color:"|
|align=left|Kirill Kuzmin
|align=left|A Just Russia — For Truth
|
|5.94%
|-
|style="background-color:"|
|align=left|Aleksandr Kurilenko
|align=left|Liberal Democratic Party
|
|5.56%
|-
|style="background:"| 
|align=left|Konstantin Kozlov
|align=left|Communists of Russia
|
|3.60%
|-
|style="background-color: "|
|align=left|Vladimir Zelensky
|align=left|Party of Pensioners
|
|3.14%
|-
|style="background-color: " |
|align=left|Stanislav Kireyev
|align=left|New People
|
|2.74%
|-
|style="background-color: "|
|align=left|Nikolay Sasin
|align=left|Party of Growth
|
|1.27%
|-
|style="background-color:"|
|align=left|Asmik Khachatryan
|align=left|Rodina
|
|1.03%
|-
| colspan="5" style="background-color:#E9E9E9;"|
|- style="font-weight:bold"
| colspan="3" style="text-align:left;" | Total
| 
| 100%
|-
| colspan="5" style="background-color:#E9E9E9;"|
|- style="font-weight:bold"
| colspan="4" |Source:
|
|}

References

Russian legislative constituencies
Politics of Stavropol Krai